This is a list of candidates for the 1917 New South Wales state election. The election was held on 24 March 1917.

During the previous parliament, the Labor Party had split over the conscription issue, with Premier William Holman leading many members into the new Nationalist Party, a merger of the pro-conscriptionist Labor members and the Liberal Party. Seats held by the ex-Labor Nationalists are shown as being Labor-held.

Retiring Members

Labor
Ernest Durack MLA (Bathurst)

Nationalist
Henry Hoyle MLA (Surry Hills) — elected as Labor
James Mercer (Rozelle) — elected as Labor
Charles Wade MLA (Gordon)

Legislative Assembly
Sitting members are shown in bold text. Successful candidates are highlighted in the relevant colour. Where there is possible confusion, an asterisk (*) is also used.

See also
 Members of the New South Wales Legislative Assembly, 1917–1920

References
 

1917